The 29th Academy Awards were held on March 27, 1957, to honor the films of 1956.

In this year, Best International Feature Film became a competitive category, having been given as a Special Achievement Award since 1947. The first competitive winner was Italy, for Federico Fellini's La Strada, which received a further nomination for Best Original Screenplay.

This was the first year (and last until 1967) in which all Best Picture nominees were in color, and all were large-scale epics: The King and I, Giant, The Ten Commandments (the highest-grossing film of the year), Friendly Persuasion, and the winner, Around the World in 80 Days. This established a trend toward blockbusters and colorful spectaculars in the category, with The Bridge on the River Kwai, Gigi, and Ben-Hur following as Best Picture winners.

The Best Original Story category was noteworthy this year for several reasons. The winner, Robert Rich (for The Brave One) was in fact a pseudonym of Dalton Trumbo, who was blacklisted at the time and thus unable to receive credit under his own name. Edward Bernds and Elwood Ullman withdrew their names from consideration for their work on High Society , as the nomination had been intended for the musical starring Grace Kelly, while Bernds and Ullman had instead written a Bowery Boys film of the same name the year before. The nomination was a double mistake, as High Society (1956) was based on the play and film The Philadelphia Story and did not qualify as an original story.

James Dean became the only actor to receive a second posthumous nomination for acting. Ingrid Bergman was not present to collect her award for Best Actress: Cary Grant accepted on her behalf. She did, however, list the nominees for Best Director via a pre-recorded segment from Paris, while the winner was announced by host Jerry Lewis.

Director John Ford's classic western The Searchers, widely seen as one of the best American films of all time, failed to receive a single nomination.

This was the second time since the introduction of the Supporting Actor and Actress awards that Best Picture, Best Director, and all four acting Oscars were given to different films. This would not happen again until the 78th Academy Awards. Around the World in 80 Days became the sixth film to win Best Picture without any acting nominations.

Awards

Nominees were announced on February 18, 1957. Winners are listed first and highlighted in boldface.

Academy Honorary Award
Eddie Cantor "for distinguished service to the film industry".

Irving G. Thalberg Memorial Award
Buddy Adler

Jean Hersholt Humanitarian Award
Y. Frank Freeman

Presenters and performers

Presenters
Carroll Baker (Presenter: Best Original Song)
Ingrid Bergman (Presenter: Best Director)
Ernest Borgnine (Presenter: Best Actress)
Gower Champion and Marge Champion (Presenters: Art Direction Awards)
Dorothy Dandridge (Presenter: Best Visual Effects)
Kirk Douglas (Presenter: Best Film Editing)
Janet Gaynor (Presenter: Best Motion Picture)
Rock Hudson and Eva Marie Saint (Presenters: Best Musical Score and Best Dramatic or Comedy Score)
Nancy Kelly (Presenter: Best Supporting Actor)
Deborah Kerr (Presenter: Writing Awards)
Jack Lemmon (Presenter: Best Supporting Actress)
Anna Magnani (Presenter: Best Actor)
Dorothy Malone (Presenter: Best Sound Recording)
Mercedes McCambridge and Robert Stack (Presenters: Documentary Awards)
Patty McCormack and Mickey Rooney (Presenters: Short Subject Awards)
George Seaton (Presenter: Best Foreign Language Film, Honorary Award, the Irving G. Thalberg Award and the Jean Hersholt Humanitarian Award)
Elizabeth Taylor (Presenter: Costume Design Awards)
Claire Trevor (Presenter: Cinematography Awards)

Performers
Bing Crosby ("True Love" from High Society)
Dorothy Dandridge ("Julie" from Julie)
The Four Aces ("Written on the Wind" from Written on the Wind)
Gogi Grant ("Que Sera, Sera (Whatever Will Be, Will Be)" from The Man Who Knew Too Much)
Tommy Sands ("Friendly Persuasion (Thee I Love)" from Friendly Persuasion)

Multiple nominations and awards

These films had multiple nominations:

10 nominations: Giant
9 nominations: The King and I
8 nominations: Around the World in 80 Days
7 nominations: The Ten Commandments
6 nominations: Friendly Persuasion
4 nominations: Baby Doll, The Bad Seed, The Eddy Duchin Story and Lust for Life
3 nominations: The Brave One, High Society, Somebody Up There Likes Me, War and Peace and Written on the Wind
2 nominations: Anastasia, The Bold and the Brave, The Dark Wave, Julie, La Strada, The Proud and Profane, The Rainmaker, Seven Samurai, The Solid Gold Cadillac and Teenage Rebel

The following films received multiple awards.

5 wins: Around the World in 80 Days and The King and I
2 wins: Somebody Up There Likes Me

See also
14th Golden Globe Awards
1956 in film
 8th Primetime Emmy Awards
 9th Primetime Emmy Awards
 10th British Academy Film Awards
 11th Tony Awards

References

Academy Awards ceremonies
1956 film awards
1956 awards in the United States
1957 in Los Angeles
1957 in New York City
1957 in American cinema
March 1957 events in the United States
Events in New York City
1950s in Manhattan